Bricherasio (French: Briqueras) is a comune (municipality) in the Metropolitan City of Turin in the Italian region Piedmont, located about  southwest of Turin.

Bricherasio borders the following municipalities: Angrogna, San Secondo di Pinerolo, Prarostino, Osasco, Garzigliana, Luserna San Giovanni, Cavour, Campiglione-Fenile, and Bibiana. Economy is based on wine and fruit production (apple, kiwi, mushrooms).

Twin towns
 Bell Ville, Argentina, since 1998
 Chorges, France, since 2003

References

External links
Official website

Cities and towns in Piedmont